Rudolf Vytlačil (9 February 1912, Schwechat – 1 June 1977) was an Czechoslovak football player and manager.

Born in Schwechat on outskirts of Vienna, Vytlačil started his career at the local club Phönix Schwechat. Later he played for SK Slovan Wien, SK Rapid Wien and Favoritner Sportclub in the Austrian Championship and for Slavia Prague in the Czechoslovak Championship.

He was the coach of the Czechoslovak national team when they finished as runners-up in the 1962 FIFA World Cup and was in charge of Bulgaria at the 1966 FIFA World Cup.

Vytlačil coached several clubs, including 1947–1948 Radomiak Radom from Poland, Levski Sofia (won two Bulgarian championships in 1965 and 1970, and one Bulgarian Cup in 1970), TJ Baník Ostrava OKD, Tatran Teplice (now FK Teplice), TJ Gottwaldov (now FC Zlín) and, from 1966 to 1968, his former club SK Rapid Wien. With Rapid he won the Austrian championship twice and reached the quarterfinal of the European Champions Cup after a victory against Real Madrid.

External links 
 Profile at rapidarchiv.at
 Profile at fotbal.cz
 Profile at slavia.cz

Austrian footballers
SK Slavia Prague players
SK Rapid Wien players
Czech footballers
Czech football managers
Czech expatriate football managers
Czechoslovakia international footballers
Czechoslovak footballers
Czechoslovak football managers
1960 European Nations' Cup managers
1962 FIFA World Cup managers
1966 FIFA World Cup managers
Bulgaria national football team managers
Czechoslovakia national football team managers
PFC Levski Sofia managers
FC Baník Ostrava managers
SK Rapid Wien managers
FK Teplice managers
SK Slavia Prague managers
Austrian people of Czech descent
Austrian expatriate sportspeople in Czechoslovakia
Czech people of Austrian descent
People from Schwechat
Footballers from Vienna
1912 births
1977 deaths
Expatriate football managers in Bulgaria
Austrian expatriate sportspeople in Bulgaria
FC Fastav Zlín managers
Association football midfielders
Křídla vlasti Olomouc managers
Footballers from Lower Austria